In geometry, an order-2 apeirogonal tiling, apeirogonal dihedron, or infinite dihedron is a tiling of the plane consisting of two apeirogons. It may be considered an improper regular tiling of the Euclidean plane, with Schläfli symbol  Two apeirogons, joined along all their edges, can completely fill the entire plane as an apeirogon is infinite in size and has an interior angle of 180°, which is half of a full 360°.

Related tilings and polyhedra
The apeirogonal tiling is the arithmetic limit of the family of dihedra {p, 2}, as p tends to infinity, thereby turning the dihedron into a Euclidean tiling.

Similarly to the uniform polyhedra and the uniform tilings, eight uniform tilings may be based from the regular apeirogonal tiling. The rectified and cantellated forms are duplicated, and as two times infinity is also infinity, the truncated and omnitruncated forms are also duplicated, therefore reducing the number of unique forms to four: the apeirogonal tiling, the apeirogonal hosohedron, the apeirogonal prism, and the apeirogonal antiprism.

See also 
 Order-3 apeirogonal tiling - hyperbolic tiling
 Order-4 apeirogonal tiling - hyperbolic tiling

Notes

References

 The Symmetries of Things 2008, John H. Conway, Heidi Burgiel, Chaim Goodman-Strass,

External links
Jim McNeill: Tessellations of the Plane

Apeirogonal tilings
Euclidean tilings
Isogonal tilings
Isohedral tilings
Order-2 tilings
Regular tilings